Ashamed, also known under the international title Life Is Peachy, is a South Korean queer film written and directed by Kim Soo-hyeon. This is Kim's second feature film after 2004's So Cute. Ashamed was released in theaters on December 8, 2011, but had already been making the rounds on the festival circuit. The film had its world premiere in the New Currents section at the 15th Busan International Film Festival and screened in the Panorama section at the 61st Berlin International Film Festival.

Plot
Arts professor Jung Ji-woo (Kim Sang-hyun) is searching for a nude model for a video clip that she will play at her exhibition. When Hee-jin (Seo Hyun-jin), one of her students, recommends Yoon Ji-woo (Kim Hyo-jin) for the job, the three women head to the beach to shoot the video. As they spend time together, Yoon Ji-woo begins to share pieces of her past relationship with Kang Ji-woo (Kim Kkot-bi). The film weaves through the pasts and presents of the three Ji-woos and focuses on their intersecting relationships.

Cast
Kim Hyo-jin as Yoon Ji-woo
Kim Kkot-bi as Kang Ji-woo
Seo Hyun-jin as Hee-jin
Kim Sang-hyun as Jung Ji-woo
Choi Min-yong as Detective Min-yong
Woo Seung-min
Kim Sun-hyuk

References

External links
 Ashamed at Daum 
  
 
 
 

2010 films
South Korean LGBT-related films
Lesbian-related films
2010s Korean-language films
South Korean romance films
2010 LGBT-related films
2010s South Korean films